The 2015–16 Holy Cross Crusaders men's basketball team represented the College of the Holy Cross during the 2015–16 NCAA Division I men's basketball season. The Crusaders, led by first year head coach Bill Carmody, played their home games at the Hart Center and were members of the Patriot League. They finished the season 15–20, 5–13 in Patriot League play to finish in ninth place. As the #9 seed, they defeated Loyola (MD), Bucknell, Army, and Lehigh to be champions of the Patriot League tournament and earn the conference's automatic bid to the NCAA tournament. As a #16 seed in the First Four they defeated Southern to advance to the first round where they lost to Oregon.

Previous season
The Crusaders finished the 2014–15 season 14–16, 8–10 in Patriot League play to finish in a three-way tie for sixth place. They advanced to the quarterfinals of the Patriot League tournament where they lost to Bucknell.

Departures

Incoming recruits

2016 class recruits

Roster

Schedule

|-
!colspan=9 style="background:#660066; color:#FFFFFF;"|Exhibition

|-
!colspan=9 style="background:#660066; color:#FFFFFF;"|Non-conference regular season

|-
!colspan=9 style="background:#660066; color:#FFFFFF;"|Patriot League regular season

|-
!colspan=9 style="background:#660066; color:#FFFFFF;"| Patriot League tournament

|-
!colspan=9 style="background:#660066; color:#FFFFFF;"|NCAA tournament

References

Holy Cross Crusaders men's basketball seasons
Holy Cross
Holy Cross Crusaders men's basketball
Holy Cross Crusaders men's basketball
Holy Cross